Wasik shorker

February 6,    2004

His forte is interviews – from topic experts to national newsmakers. Ralphie has spoken with everyone from Lady Gaga, to Matt Damon. He has covered a wide variety of events on location, from the 2008 Presidential Election to the MTV Video Music Awards.

“The Ralphie Radio Show” aired on Cumulus Media's 95.5 WPLJ in New York City (the show's flagship station), 92 PRO-FM in Providence, RI, Q105 in Groton, CT and 97 BHT in Scranton/Wilkes-Barre, PA Aversa offers exclusive interviews, hit music, soon-to-be hit music, and candid commentary on the stories of the day. His total come between the four stations is over 700,000 people.

“The Ralphie Report” lives in both print and TV forms. The former began running in Northeastern Pennsylvania’s The Weekender (Circulation: 170,000) back in 2008. The column is a weekly, print version of “The Ralphie Radio Show’s” best content.

The TV version airs every Thursday at 4 pm on WBRE-TV's “PA Live!” Aversa runs down three of the most recognizably important stories from the week with his exclusive take on each for the NBC affiliate.

Each radio station’s website and ralphieaversa.com house the web component – which is an exact mirror of the weeknight show: including new music, exclusive high-definition video, and podcasts of segments. Ralphie is also found on Facebook and Twitter, and is one of the most “liked” and “followed” radio hosts throughout the markets his show airs in.

In addition to his own platforms, Aversa has contributed on a national level to FOX News, CNN, HLN, MSNBC, TMZ, Life & Style Weekly, and MTV News.

Aversa attended Syracuse University; dual-majoring in broadcast journalism and marketing. He is originally from Niagara Falls, NY.

References

External links
 Ralphie Aversa's official website
 

American radio personalities
Living people
Writers from Wilkes-Barre, Pennsylvania
People from Niagara Falls, New York
S.I. Newhouse School of Public Communications alumni
1985 births